I Could Be With Anyone is an EP released by Kevin Devine in support of his fifth album, Brother's Blood, and his winter 2008 tour with Manchester Orchestra. The title track is featured on Brother's Blood, while the other 3 tracks are exclusive to the EP. Both "She Stayed As Steam" and "What's Keeping Us Young" were previously available to stream on Kevin's MySpace page, however, the EP features a new version of "What's Keeping Us Young".

On June 5, 2009 the video for "I Could Be With Anyone" premiered on Spinner.com, featuring "a series of couples both real and staged in various stages of their relationships." 

The title track was later covered by Manchester Orchestra on a split EP with Devine, entitled I Could Be the Only One. The band's lead vocalist Andy Hull describes the song as "...an incredibly real and painfully-depressing song. I've loved this tune since the moment I heard it."

A full band version of "She Stayed as Steam" featured as a bonus track on international version of Brother's Blood and would later be released as the title track of the She Stayed as Steam EP.

Track listing
 I Could Be With Anyone
 The Weather Is Wonderful
 She Stayed As Steam (Demo)
 What's Keeping Us Young

References

Kevin Devine EPs
2008 EPs